Le Marais Sainte-Thérèse Professional School is a private Catholic secondary school and vocational training college, located in Saint-Étienne, in the Auvergne-Rhône-Alpes region of France. The school was founded by the Society of Jesus in 1913.

Students may work toward a certificate of professional aptitude (CAP); a professional baccalaureate or a technical patent of trades (BTM).

History 
In 1913 Fr Denis Jourjon, SJ, created a learning and forgeing workshop, on what is the current site of the Le Marais Sainte-Thérèse high school. In 1960, the workshops were converted into a technical education college. Further developments resulted in the establishment on a training center in 1975, and subsequent developments included the introduction of electronics from 1979, mechanical production in 1987, metal fabrication in 1999, optics lunettary, micro-computing, and computer networking from 2003, dental prosthetics from 2005, industrial and home automated electronics from 2007, and further industrial workshops from 2009.

See also

 Catholic Church in France
 Education in France
 List of Jesuit schools

References  

Jesuit secondary schools in France
1913 establishments in France
Educational institutions established in 1913
Education in Saint-Étienne
Vocational education in France
Jesuit universities and colleges